Bingham is an unincorporated community in southeastern Sheridan County, Nebraska, United States.  It lies along Nebraska Highway 2, south-southeast of the city of Rushville, the county seat of Sheridan County.  Its elevation is 3,894 feet (1,187 m).

History
The Bingham post office was established in 1888. The origin of the name Bingham is obscure. Two sources speculate it might be the name of a pioneer settler, railroad official or of a place in Minnesota.

References

Unincorporated communities in Sheridan County, Nebraska
Unincorporated communities in Nebraska